Emily & Tim (formerly titled Outliving Emily) is a 2015 American anthology drama film written and directed by Eric Weber and starring Zosia Mamet, Thomas Mann, Alexis Bledel, Kal Penn, Cara Buono, Dominic Fumusa, Malcolm Gets, David Pittu, Andre Braugher, Phylicia Rashad, Olympia Dukakis and Louis Zorich.  It is based on Weber's short story The Pact.

Cast
Kathleen Turner as Narrator

Attraction
Zosia Mamet as Emily
Thomas Mann as Tim
Jeremy Jordan as Raymond Phayer
Luke Brandon Field
Adam Rose

Discord
Alexis Bledel as Emily
Kal Penn as Tim
Gianna Galluzzi as Meg
Alan Simpson 
Peter Y. Kim
Josh Sugarman
Teresa Kelsey

Betrayal
Cara Buono as Emily
Dominic Fumusa as Tim
Alexis Molnar
Gary Milner as Phayer
Julia Murney
Jennifer Damiano as Helayne
Joel Rooks
Peter Von Berg

Healing
Malcolm Gets as Emile
David Pittu as Tim
Richard Joseph Paul as Phayer
Zainab Jah as Helayne
Priscilla Shanks
Drena De Niro
Alok Tewari
Jenny Bacon
Dana Eskelson

Acceptance
Phylicia Rashad as Emily
Andre Braugher as Tim
Adepero Oduye
Vincent Filliatre as Raymond
Edan Alexander as Riley
Damian Norfleet as Emcee
Catherine Ryan
Oliver Solomon
Olivia Negron
Tibor Feldman

Attachment
Olympia Dukakis as Emily
Louis Zorich as Tim Hanratty
Bernie McInerney

Release
The film premiered at the Montreal World Film Festival on August 29, 2015.

Reception
Gary Goldstein of the Los Angeles Times gave the film a negative review and wrote, "But an intriguing casting gimmick can’t mask a story — and a relationship — that’s largely unremarkable."  The Chicago Tribune awarded the film two stars.

References

External links
 
 

2015 drama films
2015 films
American drama films
2010s English-language films
2010s American films